Mid-Century Sounds: Deep Cuts From The Desert is a two volume compilation album (Vinyl, LP) released in 2017 by independent record label Fervor Records in collaboration with Marmoset. Several songs on this LP charted in Billboard Magazine including "Plaything" by Ted Newman in 1957 and "Cookin" by the Al Casey Combo in 1962. Since the album's release, multiple songs have been featured in popular TV shows and films including Lionsgate Films The Glass Castle, the Netflix Original Series Orange is the New Black, and short film, Made Back East, released December 2020.

Background and production 
Mid-Century Sounds: Deep Cuts From the Desert profiles the career of the late music entrepreneur Floyd Ramsey (March 22, 1926 – April 16, 2008) The album features songs from the Phoenix, Arizona music scene from 1957 to 1973. During this time, Ramsey was instrumental in launching the careers of artists including Sanford Clark, Duane Eddy, Lee Hazlewood, Waylon Jennings, Wayne Newton, and Donna Fargo. Sanford Clark, Waylon Jennings, and a young Wayne Newton are featured on the album.

All songs on this compilation have direct ties to one of Floyd Ramsey's many music enterprises. He was the owner of Audio Recorders of Arizona in Phoenix, Arizona where most of the songs were recorded. He was the founder of several record labels including Liberty Bell Records, REV Records, Ramco Records, and ARA Records and he later acquired MCI Records, a label which had released many singles recorded at his studio. Most of the songs on this album were originally released by one of these record labels. Ramsey also owned publishing on most songs through his companies Renda Music, BMI, and Desert Palms Music, BMI. Floyd Ramsey was inducted into the Arizona Music and Entertainment Hall of Fame in 2005 for his many accomplishments.

TV, film, and advertising

Advertising 
The 1968 recording "Blending Soul" by the Soul Blenders (Side D)  was featured as the "Ad of the Day" on September 11, 2017, in Adweek Magazine.

Track listing 
Side A (1957–59)
 “Never With Your Heart” — Ralph Smith w/ Bob Taylor's Western Aces
 “I Got the Blues” — Glen Morris
 “Two Time Loser” — Joe Montgomery
 “She is My Dream” — The Tads 
 “Four in the Morning” — Dave Moore
 “A Better Man Than Me” — Gary Trexler
 “Start at the Bottom” — The Newton Brothers
 “Plaything” — Ted Newman

Side B (1960–64)
 “How Many Times” — Patti Lasalle
 “Night Creatures” — The Gigolo's
 “You’ll Never Wear a Halo” — Nick Landers
 “Do It Twist” — Ritchie Hart and His Hartbeats
 “Drifting Heart” — Roosevelt Nettles
 “Old Enough to Have a Broken Heart” — Judy Lunn
 “Cookin” — Al Casey Combo
		
Side C (1964–67)
 “My World” — Waylon Jennings
 “I’m Glad I Knew You” — P-Nut Butter
 “What’s Happening” — Phil & The Frantics
 “Boo Hoo” — Donnie Owens
 “One More Time” — Tommy Strange
 “Once Upon a Time” — Sanford Clark
 “So Goes My Dream” — Nadine Jansen
		
Side D (1968–73)
 “Happy Just to Be Alive” — Christopher Blue
 “Too Good To Be True” — Lon Rogers & The Soul Blenders
 “Get Up” — The Harvey Truitt & Jack Miller Project
 “One Afternoon” — Motion
 "The Soul Blenders” — Blending Soul
 “Ain’t No Time for Stopping’” — Fat City
 “Loaded Back” — Michael Liggins & The Supersouls

Production 
 Mastering - Telegraph Mastering by Adam Gonsalves
 Design - Always with Honor
 Manufacturing - Cascade Record Pressing
 Executive Producers - David Hilker, Jeff Freundlich
 Co-Producer / Collaborator  - Marmoset

References 

2017 compilation albums